Joseph-Napoléon-Henri Bourassa (September 1, 1868 – August 31, 1952) was a French Canadian political leader and publisher. In 1899, Bourassa was outspoken against the British government's request for Canada to send a militia to fight for Britain in the Second Boer War. Prime Minister Sir Wilfrid Laurier's compromise was to send a volunteer force, but the seeds were sown for future conscription protests during the World Wars of the next half-century. Bourassa unsuccessfully challenged the proposal to build warships to help protect the empire. He led the opposition to conscription during World War I and argued that Canada's interests were not at stake. He opposed Catholic bishops who defended military support of Britain and its allies. Bourassa was an ideological father of French-Canadian nationalism. Bourassa was also a defining force in forging French Canada's attitude to the Canadian Confederation of 1867.

Early life
Born in Montreal, Quebec, to Napoléon Bourassa and Azélie Papineau (Bourassa), Henri Bourassa was a grandson of the pro-democracy reformist politician Louis-Joseph Papineau. He was educated at École Polytechnique de Montréal and at Holy Cross College in Worcester, Massachusetts. In 1890, he became mayor of the town of Montebello, Quebec, at the age of 22.

Political career
In 1896, he was elected to the House of Commons as an independent Liberal for Labelle but resigned in 1899 to protest the sending of Canadian troops to the Second Boer War. He was re-elected soon after his resignation. He argued that Prime Minister Wilfrid Laurier was un vendu ("a sell-out") to British Empire and its supporters in Canada.

To counter what he perceived to be the evils of imperialism, he created in 1903 the Ligue nationaliste canadienne (Canadian Nationalist League) to instill a pan-Canadian nationalist spirit in the francophone population. It opposed political dependence on either Britain or the United States and supported instead Canadian autonomy within the British Empire.

Bourassa left the federal parliament on May 11, 1907, but he remained active in Quebec politics by being elected to the Legislative Assembly of Quebec in the 1908 provincial election in Montréal division no. 2. He led the Ligue until he retired from the assembly on September 5, 1912. He continued to criticize Laurier, whose compromises mostly helped the British Empire. Bourassa opposed Laurier's attempts to build a Canadian Navy in 1910, which he believed would draw Canada into future wars between Britain and Germany. He supported the eventual creation of an independent navy but did not want it to be under British command, as Laurier had planned. Bourassa's attacks depleted Laurier's strength in Quebec and contributed to the Liberal Party's loss in the 1911 election. Bourassa's moves ironically aided the election of the Conservative Party, which held more staunchly pro-imperialist policies than the Liberals.

In 1910, while he was serving in the Provincial Assembly as the member for Saint-Hyacinthe, he founded the newspaper Le Devoir to promote the Nationalist League and served as its editor until 1932. Bourassa's main objective was to position Le Devoir outside the control of the established parties in Quebec and in Ottawa, which had authority over press organs devoted to their electoral interests and attempted to control public opinion by their partisan actions. Bourassa chose the name Le Devoir for his newspaper because of its emphasis of his commitment to integrity and justice and his desire to serve the public good.

In 1913, Bourassa denounced the government of Ontario as "more Prussian than Prussia" during the Ontario Schools Question crisis (see Regulation 17) after Ontario had almost banned the use of French in its schools and made English its official language of instruction. He charged his compatriots to see their enemies inside Canada, in 1915:"The enemies of the French language, of French civilization in Canada, are not the Boches on the shores of the Spree; but the English-Canadian anglicizers, the Orange intriguers, or Irish priests. Above all they are French Canadians weakened and degraded by the conquest and three centuries of colonial servitude. Let no mistake be made: if we let the Ontario minority be crushed, it will soon be the turn of other French groups in English Canada." [in Wade, v 2 p. 671]

World Wars

Bourassa led French-Canadian opposition to the participation in World War I, especially Robert Borden's plans to implement conscription in 1917. He agreed that the war was necessary for the survival of France and Britain but felt that only Canadians who volunteered for service should be sent to the battlefields of Europe. His opposition to conscription brought him the anglophone public's disfavour, as was expressed by the hostile crowd amassed in Ottawa that threw vegetables and eggs during his oration.

Three months after stating that he had nothing more to do with politics, he returned to the House of Commons in the 1925 election with his election as an Independent MP, and he remained until his defeat in the 1935 election. In the 1930s, Bourassa demanded that Canada keep its gates shut to Jewish immigrants, like other politicians of the time.

Bourassa also opposed the draft during the conscription crisis of 1944 in World War II though less effectively, and he was a member of the Bloc populaire. His influence on Quebec's politics can still be seen in all major provincial parties.

Death and legacy
Upon his death in Outremont, Quebec in 1952 (one day shy of his 84th birthday), Henri Bourassa was interred in Montreal's Cimetière Notre-Dame-des-Neiges.

Henri Bourassa Boulevard, Henri-Bourassa metro station, and the federal riding of Bourassa, all in Montreal, are named for him. It is also the case for Henri-Bourassa Street, Henri-Bourassa park and the Regional County Municipality (RCM) of Papineau building, all of which are located in Papineauville, Québec. He is not related to Robert Bourassa, the former premier of Quebec.

Bourassa's political thought, according to Michael C. Macmillan, was largely a combination of Whig liberalism, Catholic social thought, and traditional Quebec political thought. He was distinctly liberal in his anti-imperialism and general support for civil liberties for French Canadians, and his approach to economic questions was essentially Catholic. While Bourassa embraced the ultramontane idea that the Church was responsible for faith, morals, discipline, and administration, he resisted Church involvement in the political sphere and rejected the corporatism espoused by the Church. Bourassa opposed state intervention wherever possible and increasingly throughout his career emphasized the need for moral reform.

According Levitt has shown, attitudes of historians, both Anglophone and Francophone, toward Bourassa consistently have been coloured by the position of each historian on the major issues Bourassa addressed. Goldwin Smith, a fellow anti-imperialist, introduced him into historical literature in 1902. The isolationism of the 1930s and the biculturalism of the 1960s (Bourassa, while a champion of Francophone rights, always opposed separatism) occasioned favourable treatment among Anglophones, while Lionel Groulx, his onetime foe, described him as "l'incomparable Éveilleur". Bourassa's position on social issues (Catholic, moderately reformist, emphasizing the family and agricultural values) likewise has called forth praise and blame.

Works 
(This list is incomplete)

 Le projet de Loi Navale. Sa nature ses conséquences. (Speech given at the Monument National on January 20, 1910).
 Pour la justice. La législation scolaire au Nord Ouest. Les discours de MM. Monk et Pelletier. Quelques objections. L'esprit de la Confédération.
 L'Emprunt de la Victoire la surenchère du bluff.
 Que Devons-Nous À L'Angleterre? La Défense Nationale. La Révolution Impérialiste. Le Tribut À L'Empire.
 L'intervention américaine ses motifs son objet ses conséquences.
 Le pape arbitre de la paix (1918)
 La Langue Gardienne de la Foi.
 La Propriété, Ses Bornes, Ses Abus. (Conference at the Semaine Sociale De Sherbrooke, August 11, 1924)
 Henri Bourassa; Biographie, Index Des Écrits, Index de la Correspondance Publique 1895–1924.

Bibliography 
 Samuel Leduc-Frenette, Les pèlerinages du Devoir en Acadie (1924 et 1927): un voyage intéressé et curieux pour les Canadiens français, Thesis, Concordia University, 2016, 78 p.
 Réal Bélanger, Henri Bourassa. Le fascinant destin d'un homme libre. (1868–1914), Québec, Presses de l'Université Laval, 2013, 570 p.
 Mario Cardinal, Pourquoi j'ai fondé Le Devoir. Henri Bourassa et son temps, Libre Expression, Montréal, 2010, 396 p.
 Pierre Anctil, Fais ce que dois. 60 éditoriaux pour comprendre Le Devoir sous Henri Bourassa (1910-1932), Québec, Éditions du Septentrion, 2010, 383 p.
 Yvan Lamonde, Histoire sociale des idées au Québec (1896-1929), Montréal, Éditions Fides, 2000, 895p.
 Yvan Lamonde, Histoire sociale des idées au Québec, vol. II (1896-1929), Montréal, Éditions Fides, 2004, 328 p.
 Robert Comeau et Luc Desrochers (dir.), Le Devoir. Un journal indépendant (1910-1995), Sainte-Foy, Presses de l'Université du Québec, 1996, 368 p.
 Robert Lahaise (dir.), Le Devoir. Reflet du Québec au 20e siècle, Montréal, Hurtubise, 1994, 504 p.
 Pierre Anctil, Le Devoir, les Juifs et l'immigration. De Bourassa à Laurendeau, Québec, Institut québécois de recherche sur la culture, 1988, 172 p.
 David Rome, The Jewish Biography of Henri Bourassa, Montréal, National Archives, Canadian Jewish Congress, 1988, 2 volumes.
 François-Albert Angers et Aurélien Boisvert, L’égarement du «Devoir», Montréal, Éditions du Franc-Canada, 1986, 105 p.
 Auldham Roy Petrie, Henri Bourassa, Don Mills, Ont., Fitzhenry & Whiteside, cop., 1980, 63 p.
 Joseph Levitt, Henri Bourassa, Catholic Critic, Ottawa, [Canadian Historical Association], 1976, 24 p.
 Joseph Levitt (ed.), Henri Bourassa on Imperialism and Biculturalism, 1900–1918, Toronto, Copp. Clark Pub Co., 1970, 183 p.
 Joseph Levitt, Henri Bourassa and the Golden Calf. The Social Program of the Nationalists of Quebec, 1900–1914, Ottawa, Éditions de l'Université d'Ottawa, 1969, 178 p.
 Casey Murrow, Henri Bourassa and French-Canadian Nationalism. Opposition to Empire, Montréal, Harvest House, 1968, 143 p.
 André Bergevin, Cameron Nish, Anne Bourassa, Henri Bourassa. Biographie, index des écrits, index de la correspondance publique, 1895–1924, Montréal, Éditions de l'Action nationale, 1966, 150 p. 
 Martin Patrick O'Connell, Henri Bourassa and Canadian Nationalism, thesis, University of Toronto, 1954, 304 p.
 Rumilly, Robert. Henri Bourassa – La Vie Publique D'un Grand Canadien (1944), also published as Histoire De La Province De Quebec: XIII: Henri Bourassa.
 Hommage à Henri Bourassa. Reproduit du numéro souvenir paru dans Le Devoir du 25 octobre 1952, Montréal, Le Devoir, 1952, 216 p.; 2nd edition, 1953, 305 p.

Articles and chapters 
 Lucien Bouchard: Henri Bourassa, en Bâtisseurs d'Amérique: Des canadiens français qui ont faite de l'histoire. Dir. André Pratte, Jonathan Kay. La Presse, Montréal 2016
 Legacy. How french Canadians shaped North America. McClelland & Stewart, Toronto 2016; 2019
 Geoff Keelan, « Catholic Neutrality: The Peace of Henri Bourassa  », Journal of the Canadian Historical Association, vol. 22, no. 1, 2011, p. 99-132
 Réal Bélanger, « BOURASSA, HENRI  », in Dictionnaire biographique du Canada, vol. 18, Université Laval/University of Toronto, 2009.
 Rolando Gomes, « Henri Bourassa et l’impérialisme britannique (1899–1918), in Bulletin d’histoire politique, volume 16, numéro 3, printemps 2008, p. 161-182.
 Joseph Levitt, « Henri Bourassa », in L'Encyclopédie canadienne, 2008.
 Béatrice Richard, « Henri Bourassa et la conscription : traitre ou sauveur ? », in Revue militaire canadienne/Canadian Military Journal, volume 7, no. 4 (hiver), 2006–2007, p. 75-83.
 Gilles Gallichan, « La carrière parlementaire d'Henri Bourassa à Québec », in  Revue parlementaire canadienne, automne 1996.
 « Bourassa, Henri », in Dictionnaire des auteurs de langue française en Amérique du Nord, 1989.
 René Durocher, « Henri Bourassa, les évêques et la guerre de 1914–1918  », Historical Papers / Communications historiques, vol. 6, no 1, 1971, p. 248-275.
 Susan Mann Robertson, « Variations on a Nationalist Theme: Henri Bourassa and Abbé Groulx in the 1920’s », Historical Papers / Communications historiques, vol. 5, no 1, 1970, p. 109-119.
 Joseph Levitt, « La perspective nationaliste d'Henri Bourassa, 1896–1914 », Revue d'histoire de l'Amérique française, vol. 22, no 4, 1969, p. 567-582.
 Richard Jones « La perspective nationaliste d'Henri Bourassa, 1896–1914 : commentaire », Revue d'histoire de l'Amérique française, vol. 22, no 4, 1969, p. 582-586.
 Pierre-R. Desrosiers, «Le Castor rouge. La genèse et le développement de la pensée politique et sociale d'Henri Bourassa», in Parti pris, vol. 4, nos. 9–12 (mai-août), 1967, p. 146-164.
 James I. W. Corcoran, « Henri Bourassa et la guerre sud-africaine (part 4) », Revue d'histoire de l'Amérique française, vol. 19, no 3, 1965, p. 414-442.
 James I. W. Corcoran, « Henri Bourassa et la guerre sud-africaine (part 3) », Revue d'histoire de l'Amérique française, vol. 19, no 2, 1965, p. 229-237
 James I. W. Corcoran, « Henri Bourassa et la guerre sud-africaine (part 2) », Revue d'histoire de l'Amérique française, vol. 19, no 1, 1965, p. 84-105.
 James I. W. Corcoran, « Henri Bourassa et la guerre sud-africaine (part 1) », Revue d'histoire de l'Amérique française, vol. 18, no 3, 1964, p. 343-356.
 « Un document historique: toute la pensée de Bourassa sur le séparatisme », in L'Action nationale, vol. 53, no. 9, mai 1964.
 André Laurendeau (dir.), «Henri Bourassa», in L'Action nationale, vol. 43, no.1, janvier 1954
 Marine Leland, « Quelques observations sur le nationalisme de Henri Bourassa  », Report of the Annual Meeting of the Canadian Historical Association / Rapports annuels de la Société historique du Canada, vol. 30, no 1, 1951, p. 60-63.
 « Henri Bourassa » in Biographies canadiennes-françaises. 3e édition, Ottawa, 1923, p. 140.
 « Henri Bourassa » in Biographies canadiennes-françaises. 2e édition, Ottawa, 1922, p. 227.

Other works 
 « Avant le combat, Henri Bourassa », Résonances, Savoir média
 Christian Blais and al., Le Devoir, témoin de la vie politique québécoise. Une exposition sur les 100 ans du Devoir à découvrir à la Bibliothèque de l'Assemblée nationale, du 17 février au 1er octobre 2010, Québec, Bibliothèque de l'Assemblée nationale, 2010, 36 p. 
 « La conscription, Henri Bourassa », Résonances, Savoir média
 Paul Racine, Henri Bourassa à Notre-Dame, Montréal, Éditions de l'Entr'aide, 1941?, 52 p.
 « Le péril de l'immigration, Henri Bourassa », Résonances, Savoir média
 Pierre Colmet, M. Bourassa et la Judéo-Maçonnerie, Paris, Revue internationale des Sociétés secrètes, 1924, p. 909-915.
 E. Roux, M. Henri Bourassa au service de l'Allemagne, Montréal, Imprimerie Perrault, 1917?, 58 p.
 Joseph-Arthur D'Amours, Où allons-nous? Le nationalisme canadien. Lettres de «Un Patriote» publiées dans le journal La Presse, augmentées d'une introduction, d'additions et d'appendices documentaires, Montréal, Société d'éditions patriotiques, 1916, 73 p.
 Canadian Nationalism and the War, Montréal, [s.n.], 1916, 31 p.
 LaChapelle, Guy and Comeau, Robert, ed. Robert Bourasa: Un Bâtisseur Tranquille Pr. de l'U. Laval, 2003. 406 p.
 Levitt, Joseph. "Images of Bourassa" Journal of Canadian Studies 1978 13(1): 100–113. 
 MacMillan, C. Michael. "Henri Bourassa on the Defence of Language Rights" Dalhousie Review 1982a 62(3): 413–430. 
 MacMillan, C. Michael. "The Character of Henri Bourassa's Political Philosophy" American Review of Canadian Studies 1982b 12(1): 10–29. 
 Mason Wade, The French Canadians, 1760–1945 (1955).
 Alfred George Gardiner, Henri Bourassa and the Future of Canada, Montréal, Le Devoir Printing, 1914, 7 p.
 The character of Henri Bourassa played by Christian Martel appears in the 5th episode of season 13 of Murdoch Mysteries.

See also

 Politics of Quebec
 Conscription Crisis of 1917
 Conscription Crisis of 1944
 National Assembly of Quebec
 List of third party leaders (Quebec)
 History of Quebec

References

Primary sources
 Henri Bourassa fonds at Library and Archives Canada. Archival reference number is R8069.
 Patrick Allen et al., eds. La pensée de Henri Bourassa (1954)
 Levitt, Joseph, ed. Henri Bourassa on Imperialism and Biculturalism, 1900–1918 (1970)

External links
 
 
 "Henri Bourassa’s Career in the Quebec National Assembly", Canadian Parliamentary Review
 

Link to Dictionary of Canadian Biography — DCB Initiative

1868 births
1952 deaths
Activists from Montreal
Canadian anti–World War I activists
Canadian Roman Catholics
Independent MPs in the Canadian House of Commons
Liberal Party of Canada MPs
Members of the House of Commons of Canada from Quebec
Persons of National Historic Significance (Canada)
Politicians from Montreal
Members of the National Assembly of Quebec
Canadian nationalists
Le Devoir people
Burials at Notre Dame des Neiges Cemetery